Nahuel Pájaro (born 9 May 1997) is an Argentine professional footballer who plays as a midfielder.

Career
Pájaro began in the youth ranks of Aldosivi at the age of eight, eleven years later he was promoted into the club's first-team. His debut came on 3 February 2016 in a 1–1 draw against Newell's Old Boys during the 2016 Argentine Primera División season. He made three further appearances in 2016. However, Pájaro appeared in zero matches for Aldosivi during 2016–17 as the team were relegated to Primera B Nacional. He joined Primera B Metropolitana side San Telmo on loan in February 2018. 

In November 2021, Pájaro signed for Estudiantes de Olavarría.

Career statistics
.

References

External links
 

1997 births
Living people
Sportspeople from Mar del Plata
Argentine footballers
Association football midfielders
Argentine Primera División players
Primera Nacional players
Primera B Metropolitana players
Torneo Argentino A players
Aldosivi footballers
San Telmo footballers
Estudiantes de Olavarría footballers